This article concerns the period 629 BC – 620 BC.

Events and trends
 c. 627 BC—Death of Assurbanipal, king of Assyria; he is succeeded by Assur-etel-ilani.
 627 BC—Creation of Durrës, at the time Epidamnus.
 627 BC—Spring and Autumn period: Jin defeats Qin in the Battle of Xiao
 626 BC—Nabopolassar revolts against Assyria, founds the Neo-Babylonian Empire.
 625 BC—Medes and Babylonians assert their independence from Assyria and attack Nineveh (approximate date).
 c. 625 BC—Orientalizing period of vases ends in Ancient Greece.
 c. 623 BC—Sin-shar-ishkun succeeds his brother Assur-etel-ilani as king of Assyria.
 622 or 621 BC - Draco makes the first law code for Ancient Greece.

Significant people
 628 BC—Death of Duke Wen of Jin, China.
 c. 628 BC—Commonly accepted date for the Birth of Zoroaster.
 c. 626 BC—Jeremiah.
 625 BC—Death of Yuan Taotu, China.
 c. 624 BC—Birth of Thales.
 c. 623 BC—Birth of Buddha.
 c. 622 BC—Birth of Ezekiel.
 621 BC—Death of Duke Mu of Qin, China.
 c. 620-564 BC Aesop

References